Charlotta Jonsson (born 11 May 1973) is a Swedish actress. She is from Umeå in northern Sweden but now lives in Stockholm.

Between 2000 and 2004, Jonsson studied at the Gothenburg Theatre Academy. She is best known for her role as Charlotte Ekebladh in the 1999-2001 TV series Sjätte dagen (in English The Sixth Day) and as Linda Wallander in the 2013 film series Wallander about life of Kurt Wallander.

Filmography
TV series
1999 - 2001 - Sjätte dagen 
1999 - Skilda världar
2001 - En ängels tålamod 
2003 - Utan dig
2007 - Saltön 
2008 - Höök
2010 - Den fördömde (aka Sebastian Bergman)
2010 - Solsidan 
2011 - Bibliotekstjuven

Wallander series (2013)
"Den orolige mannen"
"Försvunnen"
"Saknaden"
"Sveket"
"Mordbrännaren"
"Sorgfågeln"

Voice
2008 - Ponyo på klippan vid havet (voice on Swedish version)

Others
2009 - Oskuld
2011 - Juni
2011 - The Sexual Monologues

References

External links

Swedish film actresses
1973 births
Living people
People from Umeå
Actresses from Stockholm